Nguyễn Anh Tuấn (born 25 March 1994) is a Vietnamese footballer who plays for Đồng Nai as a centre-back. He was called up to the Vietnam national football team in 2015.

References 

1984 births
Living people
Vietnamese footballers
Association football defenders
Vietnam international footballers
Navibank Sài Gòn FC players
Haiphong FC players
V.League 1 players